The Supreme Court Review is an annual peer-reviewed law journal covering the legal implications of decisions by the Supreme Court of the United States. It is published by the University of Chicago Press and was established in 1960. The journal's founding editor Philip B. Kurland held the position until 1988. The editors-in-chief are Dennis J. Hutchinson, David A. Strauss, and Geoffrey R. Stone (University of Chicago Law School).

Abstracting and indexing
The journal is abstracted and indexed in:
EBSCO databases
MEDLINE/PubMed (selected citations only)
ProQuest databases
Scopus
Social Sciences Citation Index
According to the Journal Citation Reports, the journal has a 2016 impact factor of 1.188.

References

External links

American law journals
Publications established in 1960
1960 establishments in Illinois
University of Chicago Press academic journals